Ugly Side of Love is the debut studio album from the British duo band Malachai. The album was originally released by Invada Records on 11 February 2009, comprising different cover artwork and the band's then-name Malakai, but was re-released by Domino Records on 19 April 2010.

Track listing

Response

The album received a mixed review in The Guardian, with Michael Hann stating that When it works - on the likes of Shitkicker and How Long - it's terrific; but they can't keep the standards up: it's too fragmentary, too busy being groovier than thou.

References

2010 albums
Double Six Records albums